Raymond G. "Butch" Feher (born May 19, 1954 in Flint, Michigan) is a retired professional basketball shooting guard as a member of the Phoenix Suns (1976–77). He attended Vanderbilt University, where as a member of the school's basketball team he scored 30 points three separate times. He was drafted by the Suns during the second round of the 1976 NBA draft.

References

External links

Living people
1954 births
American men's basketball players
Basketball players from Flint, Michigan
Phoenix Suns draft picks
Phoenix Suns players
Shooting guards
Vanderbilt Commodores men's basketball players